Farm Windhoek is a commercial farm adjacent to the capital of Namibia, Windhoek, with mixed recreational and agricultural use. It belongs to the City of Windhoek and is leased to different private operators.

The municipality of Windhoek owns five farms that are adjacent to or near the boundaries of the current urban suburbs. Among these farmlands is Farm Windhoek, which is registered under the name Windhoek Townlands Commonage 2. The land measures .

Recreational activities 
Recreational sports are a main land use of Farm Windhoek. For the operation of the recreational trails, the private sector company Farmwindhoek Adventure Tourism was registered in 2014. The trails are open to the public, but an entrance fee applies.

Farm Windhoek is regularly used as venue for sporting events, such as mountain biking races and running competitions.

Other activities 

Farm Windhoek is partitioned for different land uses. On around  a police village is established. Farm Windhoek is also leased by the City of Windhoek for agricultural land use, mainly livestock herding.

References

External links 

 IJG Trails Website
 Map of hiking and mountain biking trails on Trailforks

Sport in Windhoek
Sports venues in Namibia
Farms in Namibia
Outdoor recreation in Africa